El-Sayed Ibrahim Masoud (born 15 November 1914, date of death unknown) was an Egyptian weightlifter. He competed in the men's lightweight event at the 1936 Summer Olympics.

References

External links
 

1914 births
Year of death missing
Egyptian male weightlifters
Olympic weightlifters of Egypt
Weightlifters at the 1936 Summer Olympics